The Connecticut Department of Administrative Services (DAS) is a department of the American state of Connecticut. It oversees many of the state's core functions and acts as a service provider and administrator for other state departments and agencies.

Overview 
The DAS serves as the state's “nerve center” and oversees most state contracting and asset management.

The DAS handles the contracting for prisoner communications services. Their handling of those contracts has been heavily criticized.

History 
In July 2013 the Connecticut Department of Public Works became part of the DAS.

In 2017 independent auditors found massive problems with the way the Department tracks orders and payments as well as failing to properly punish drivers of state vehicles who misused their vehicles.

In 2019 Governor Ned Lamont appointed Josh Geballe as commissioner. Geballe is a ten-year IBM veteran who most recently served as CEO of New Haven based Core Informatics. He replaced retiring Commissioner Melody Currey. 

On February 1, 2022, Governor Lamont announced that Josh Geballe has accepted a new job opportunity in the private sector and plans to leave service with the state effective February 14, 2022. The governor appointed Michelle Gilman of Colchester to succeed Geballe in the position of DAS commissioner. Gilman served as deputy chief operating officer in a position that she’s held since March 2020. In this role, she has managed numerous COVID-19 initiatives on behalf of the Lamont administration, including overseeing the alternate hospital site initiative to prepare for potential surge capacity, as well as implementation of the state’s nationally recognize free testing program with a strong emphasis on access for vulnerable populations. More recently, she supported the state’s vaccine program roll-out, working closely with medical providers, municipalities, and workforce partners to ensure an efficient, equitable implementation. Throughout the pandemic, she also assisted with PPE, medical equipment, and testing supply management to meet the needs of the state’s residents.

Components 
 Bureau of Enterprise Systems and Technology

External links 
DAS website

References 

State agencies of Connecticut